Yeh Dil Kisko Doon is a 1963 Bollywood Romantic comedy film. The film had Shashi Kapoor, Ragini, Agha, Jeevan, and Anwar in lead roles. The film is known for its music and songs.

Cast 
 Shashi Kapoor as Anand / Raja
 Ragini as Sherry
 Agha as Raja / Pandu
 Jayshree Gadkar as Champa
 Jeevan as Master

Soundtrack 
The songs for the film was composed by Iqbal Qureshi.

References

External links 

1963 films
1960s Hindi-language films
Films scored by Iqbal Qureshi
Films directed by Kanak Mishra